The 20th Independent Infantry Brigade was an infantry brigade  of the British Army, raised during the Second World War.

History
The brigade was formed in Aldershot Command in April 1940. It served during the Battle of France in 1940, briefly defending Boulogne in May 1940 (22–23 May 1940) before being successfully evacuated. After return to the United Kingdom, the brigade served in Eastern Command and London District.

On 15 September 1941, the brigade was converted into the 5th Guards Armoured Brigade; a component of the Guards Armoured Division. It served with distinction through the battles in Normandy, France, Belgium, the Netherlands, and Germany.

Commanders
The following officers commanded the brigade:
 Brigadier Oliver Leese (from 22 April 1940)
 Brigadier William Fox-Pitt (from 10 May 1940)

Order of battle
The following units comprised the brigade:
 2nd Battalion, Grenadier Guards
 2nd Battalion, Welsh Guards
 5th Battalion, Loyal Regiment (North Lancashire) – (motorcycle unit, until 22 May 1940)
 1st Battalion, Royal Norfolk Regiment – (joined 22 July 1940)
 20th Independent Infantry Brigade (Guards) Anti-Tank Company
 275th Anti-Tank Battery (less one Troop) of 69th Anti-Tank Regiment Royal Artillery – (attached during Boulogne operation)
 225th Light Field Ambulance Royal Army Medical Corps – (joined July 1940)
 20th Independent Infantry Brigade (Guards) Company Royal Army Service Corps  – (joined July 1940)
 3rd Royal Tank Regiment

Notes

References
 Major L.F. Ellis, History of the Second World War, United Kingdom Military Series: The War in France and Flanders 1939–1940, London: HM Stationery Office, 1954.
 

Military units and formations established in 1940
Infantry brigades of the British Army
Infantry brigades of the British Army in World War II
Guards Division (United Kingdom)
Military units and formations disestablished in 1941